Leto is a monotypic moth genus of the family Hepialidae described by Jacob Hübner in 1820. The only described species is Leto venus, described by Pieter Cramer in 1780, which is endemic to South Africa. The larval food plant is Virgilia.

References

External links
Hepialidae genera

Endemic moths of South Africa
Hepialidae
Moths described in 1780
Moths of Africa
Taxa named by Pieter Cramer
Monotypic moth genera